The Baron of Serra da Estrela was a noble title created by decree of King John VI on 5 February 1818, in favor Gracia Eça Telles de Abreu.

List of barons
 Gracia Eça Telles de Abreu, 1st (and only) Baron of Serra da Estrela.

References
 

Serra da Estrela
1818 establishments in Portugal